Wyre Forest railway station was a station to the north of Far Forest, Worcestershire, England. The station which served the Wyre Forest was opened in 1869 and closed in 1962.

Although the station was situated on the Tenbury and Bewdley Railway which opened on 1 August 1864, the construction of Wyre Forest Station required the consent of the Office of Woods and Forests. As a result the station did not open until 1 June 1869. The station closed to passenger traffic along with the rest of the Wyre Forest Line on 1 August 1962.

References

Further reading

Disused railway stations in Worcestershire
Railway stations in Great Britain opened in 1869
Railway stations in Great Britain closed in 1962
Former Great Western Railway stations